The 2017 Korea National League, also known as the Incheon International Airport National League 2017 due to the sponsorship of Incheon International Airport, was the 15th season of the Korea National League, the third tier of South Korea's football league system. Each of eight clubs played four times against all other clubs in the regular season, and the top three clubs of the regular season qualified for post-season playoffs.

Teams

Regular season

League table

Positions by matchday

Championship playoffs

See also
2017 in South Korean football
2017 Korea National League Championship
2017 Korean FA Cup

References

External links
RSSSF

Korea National League seasons
2017 in South Korean football
2017 domestic association football leagues